Sant Roc is a Barcelona Metro station in Sant Roc, a neighbourhood of the municipality of Badalona, in the metropolitan area of Barcelona. It's served by L2 and since 2007, by Trambesòs route T5. It was opened in 1985 as part of L4 and moved to L2 in 2002. It can be accessed from Plaça President Tarradellas and from Carrer Alfons XII.

Services

See also
List of Barcelona Metro stations

External links

Trenscat.com

Railway stations in Spain opened in 1985
Barcelona Metro line 2 stations
Trambesòs stops
Railway stations in Badalona